was a Japanese actor.

Career
In 1959, Wada was scouted and joined Nikkatsu Company at the age of 15. Wada's film debut was the 1959 film Mugon no Rantō directed by Katsumi Nishikawa. In 1971, he left Nikkatsu and became a freelance actor. As a freelance actor he appeared in supporting roles in such films as The Street Fighter's Last Revenge, New Battles Without Honor and Humanity: Last Days of the Boss.

Selected filmography

Film
 Mugon no Rantō (1959) : Masao Kinoshita
 The Poem of the Blue Star (1960) : Toru Fujimoto
 Go to Hell, Hoodlums! (1960) : Sadao Matsudaira
 Carmen from Kawachi (1962) : Akira Sakata
 Sunset Hill (1964) : Shinji
 Gate of Flesh (1964) : Abe
 Three Stray Dogs'7 : Eiji Minagawa
 The Black Sheep (1967) : Jun Yamazaki
 Gappa: The Triphibian Monster (1967) : Machida
 To Kill a Kille (1967) : Hanji
 Alleycat Rock: Female Boss (1970) : Michio Yagami
 The Street Fighter's Last Revenge (1974) : Kunigami
 Barefoot in Blue Jeans (1975) : Keiichi Kazama
 New Battles Without Honor and Humanity: Last Days of the Boss (1976) : Tsutomu Nakamichi
 Eden no Umi (1976)
 A Tale of Sorrow and Sadness (1977) : Yoshizawa
 Proof of the Man (1977) : Kawanishi
 Mito Kōmon (1978) : Genpachiro Tsurugi

TelevisionRyōma ga Yuku (1968) : Takasugi SinsakuEdo o Kiru III (1977) : SakichiŌoka Echizen'' (1978–86) : Kazama Shunsuke

References

1944 births
1986 deaths
Japanese male film actors
20th-century Japanese male actors
People from Mito, Ibaraki
Actors from Ibaraki Prefecture